Mellat Investment Bank, also known as Mellatib (Tamin Sarmaye Bank Mellat) is an Iranian investment banking firm based in Tehran. The company offers investment banking services. Mellat Investment Bank is a private joint stock company.

It is regulated by the country's Securities and Exchange Organization (SEO) as part of the government's economic reform of the banking system.

History
Mellat Investment Bank was established under the license of Security Exchange Organization on 30 August 2010.
The company began operations on January 18, 2011, and provides various types of financial services such as brokerage, broker-dealer, market making, asset management, Advisory services, underwriting, firm commitment, holding seminars and conferences regarding Islamic financing systems such as Sukuk and all other permitted financial services.
The Islamic Financial Services Board (IFSB) admitted Mellat Investment Bank into its membership in 2014.

Operations
MellatIB provides financing and underwriting services. It helps with public offering of equity Islamic "debt" instruments including different kinds of Sukuk).
Advisory services–Financing optimization, securities issuance, valuation, initial public offerings, securities assignment, risk management, exchange listings, mergers and acquisitions, restructuring, development, improvement, planning, budgeting and security pricing
 Marketing and managing securities assignment 
 Administering listing 
 Permits for offerings
 Designing and offering financial instruments
 Mutual funds and other funds
 Brokerage
 Broker-dealer
 Asset management
 Market making
 Drawing support for security underwriting 
 Obtaining credit and financial resources
 Issuing, confirming and accepting bills of guarantee

CEO
Afshar Serkanian

Shareholders
The Mellat Financial Group is the largest shareholder.

Organization
Mellat Investment Bank is organized in four business units:
 Financing and underwriting services
 Financial services
 Asset management
 Alternative investment

See also

 Banking and insurance in Iran
 Privatization in Iran 
 Tehran Stock Exchange

References

External links

Banks of Iran
Banks established in 2011
Financial services companies established in 2011
Investment banks
Iranian companies established in 2011